Susan Tully (born 20 October 1967) is an English actress, television producer, and television director.

Her most prominent television acting roles were those of rebellious teenager Suzanne Ross in Grange Hill and single mother Michelle Fowler in the BBC soap opera EastEnders. Tully played one of the original EastEnders characters, appearing in the first episode on 19 February 1985 and remaining central to the series until 1995.

She then gave up acting in favour of working behind the camera, and since then has directed and produced British television programmes.

Early life 
Tully's father was a watch-case maker, and her mother a housewife. Tully was brought up on a London council estate.

While at school in Barnsbury, Islington, she took up acting as a hobby and attended the Anna Scher children's theatre, which began a fast track into television work.

Career

Acting
At the age of nine Tully hosted the live television children's programme Our Show and later worked on The Saturday Banana with Bill Oddie.

She was cast in the BBC children's television serial Grange Hill. She played schoolgirl Suzanne Ross for three years (1981–1984). At the age of 17, Tully secured a major role in the BBC's new soap opera EastEnders. She played Michelle Fowler from the show's inception in 1985 to 1995. During her time on the show, her character became pregnant at the age of 16 after having an affair with the 39-year-old adulterer Den Watts. In December 2016, EastEnders recast the role of Michelle Fowler to actress Jenna Russell after Tully repeatedly turned down offers to return. The show's executive producer at the time, Sean O'Connor, has said that Tully gave her blessing for the recast to take place.

Directing and producing
In the late 1990s, Tully began concentrating on directing for television (credited as "Sue Tully").

Personal life 
Tully is a supporter of the Meningitis Trust and she has also been involved in the Comic Relief fundraising event. She is a close friend of Letitia Dean, who played her best friend Sharon Watts in EastEnders. Tully was a bridesmaid at Dean's wedding to Jason Pethers in 2002.

References

External links

1967 births
Living people
Actresses from London
Alumni of the Anna Scher Theatre School
English television actresses
English soap opera actresses
English television directors
British women television directors
People from Highgate
English child actresses